The Bogan Boarding House, at 221 Main St. in Park City, Utah, was built in .  It was listed on the National Register of Historic Places in 1984.

It was deemed significant as one of only four boarding houses surviving in Park City from its mining era, and also as one of only four built in town after a 1901 legislative bill cancelled the right of mine owners to require miners to live in company-owned boarding houses up near their mines (unless married and living with wife/family in town).

References

Hotel buildings on the National Register of Historic Places in Utah
Hotel buildings completed in 1904
Buildings and structures in Park City, Utah
National Register of Historic Places in Summit County, Utah
Individually listed contributing properties to historic districts on the National Register in Utah